Thomas Medlycott may refer to:

Thomas Medlycott (1628–1716), MP for Abingdon
Thomas Medlycott (1662–1738), Chief Commissioner of Revenue in Ireland, MP for Milborne Port and Westminster, 2nd son of the above
Thomas Medlycott (1697–1763), MP for Milborne Port from 1747 to 1763, nephew of the above.

See also
 Medlycott Baronets, title in the Baronetage of the United Kingdom